The 2010–11 Vancouver Canucks season was the 41st season in the modern Canucks history. The Vancouver Canucks won their fifth Northwest division title, third conference championship and first Presidents' Trophy. They also reached the Stanley Cup Finals for the third time in franchise history, losing to the Boston Bruins in seven games. This marked the last time a Canadian team contended in the Stanley Cup Finals until the Montreal Canadiens did so in 2021, ten years later.

Events

Off-season

Entry draft
The 2010 NHL Entry Draft was held June 25–26, 2010, at Staples Center in Los Angeles, California. The Canucks had the 25th overall draft choice in the first round as a result of being defeated by the Chicago Blackhawks in the Western Conference semi-final, but that draft choice was traded to the Florida Panthers. The Canucks also did not have a second- or third-round draft pick. Their second-round pick was traded to the Buffalo Sabres in exchange for Steve Bernier. Their third-round pick was traded to the Carolina Hurricanes at the NHL trade deadline in exchange for Andrew Alberts. The Canucks acquired an additional sixth-round draft choice from the Phoenix Coyotes as a result of a trade that sent Mathieu Schneider to Phoenix. Vancouver had the 115th, 145th, 172nd, 175th and 205th overall draft choices.

Trades
On June 25, 2010, the Canucks acquired Keith Ballard and Victor Oreskovich from the Florida Panthers in exchange for Steve Bernier, Michael Grabner and the 25th overall pick in the 2010 NHL Entry Draft.

Mike Gillis traded Shane O'Brien and Dan Gendur to the Nashville Predators in exchange for Ryan Parent and Jonas Andersson on October 5, 2010. Parent was immediately waived after being acquired while Andersson was assigned to the Manitoba Moose (now St. John's Ice Caps) of the American Hockey League. On October 6, Darcy Hordichuk was traded to the Florida Panthers in exchange for Andrew Peters. Peters would play for the Manitoba Moose.

On October 7, Mike Gillis made another trade with the Florida Panthers, this time acquiring Nathan Paetsch for Sean Zimmerman.

Player signings
On April 6, 2010, the Canucks signed Swedish goaltender Eddie Läck to a two-year entry level contract. Lack spent the 2009–10 season as a member of the Brynäs IF, posting a 2.67 goals against average (GAA) and a .911 save percentage. He was expected to start the year with the Manitoba Moose.

On May 31, 2010, the Canucks announced that they signed three defencemen, including prospect Yann Sauvé. Sauvé was drafted 41st overall by the Canucks in the 2008 draft. In addition, they signed free agent Lee Sweatt and Christopher Tanev. Sweatt split time in the Finnish SM-liiga and Kontinental Hockey League (KHL) for the 2009–10 season. He registered nine goals and seven assists in 21 games for TPS in Finland. Sweatt added two goals and five assists in 37 games in the KHL with Dinamo Riga. Christopher Tanev signed as a free agent after playing in the NCAA, where he scored 10 goals and 18 assists in 41 games for the RIT Tigers.

On June 1, 2010, Vancouver signed Anton Rödin to a three-year, entry-level contract. Rödin was drafted 53rd overall by the Canucks in the 2009 Draft. He spent the 2009–10 season in the Swedish Elite League with Brynäs IF. He also played at the 2010 World Junior Championships, where he won a bronze medal with Sweden. He finished the tournament tied for second in scoring for Sweden with three goals and ten points, good enough for ninth in the tournament.

On June 2, 2010, Mike Gillis signed Cory Schneider to a contract extension with the team. He was drafted in the first round, 26th overall, of the 2004 NHL Entry Draft by the Canucks. He spent the last two seasons playing with the Manitoba Moose of the AHL, where he was named the League's Goaltender of the Year in 2008–09 while leading the Moose to the Calder Cup Final. The Canucks also announced that they signed Peter Andersson to an entry-level contract. Andersson was drafted 143rd overall by the Canucks in 2009.

On June 16, 2010, the Vancouver Canucks re-signed pending unrestricted free agent Aaron Rome to a two-year contract. The deal is worth $1.5 million and will have a salary cap hit of $750,000 per season. On July 2, 2010, Alexandre Bolduc signed a one-year, two-way contract worth $500,000. Shane O'Brien re-signed with the Canucks on July 6, 2010, when he accepted his qualifying offer. The new contract will pay O'Brien $1.6 million for one year. Tanner Glass also signed a one-year contract worth $625,000.

On July 22, Jannik Hansen was awarded a one-year contract worth $825,000 by an arbitrator.

On July 26, the Canucks re-signed Mason Raymond to a new two-year contract worth a total of $5.1 million.

Free agency
On July 1, the Vancouver Canucks signed Dan Hamhuis to a six-year contract worth $27 million, Jeff Tambellini to a 1-year contract worth $500,000, Manny Malhotra to a three-year contract worth $7.5 million and Joel Perrault to a one-year contract worth $510,000. The Canucks signed Tyler Weiman on July 12 to a one-year contract worth $500,000.

On August 19, Vancouver signed unrestricted free agent Bill Sweatt, the younger brother of Lee Sweatt, to a three-year, entry-level contract worth $2.7 million. The contract also includes an additional $300,000 per season in potential performance bonuses. Bill Sweatt was drafted 38th overall by the Chicago Blackhawks in 2007, but decided not to sign a contract until completing four years of college. He was subsequently traded to the Toronto Maple Leafs along with Kris Versteeg, but maintained his desire to test free agency. He eventually decided to re-unite with his brother in Vancouver.

The Canucks signed unrestricted free agent Raffi Torres to a one-year contract worth $1 million on August 25.

On October 7, the Canucks signed Peter Schaefer to a one-year, two-way contract worth $600,000. Schaefer played for the Canucks between 1998 and 2000 before being traded to the Ottawa Senators for Sami Salo.

Pre-season

Training camp
The Canucks held their training camp in Penticton, British Columbia, at the South Okanagan Events Centre. In addition to training camp, the Canucks hosted a Young Stars prospect tournament prior to the start of training camp from September 12 to 16. The event featured prospects from five teams in an eight-game round robin format. The tournament included the Anaheim Ducks, Calgary Flames, Edmonton Oilers and San Jose Sharks. The Canucks finished the tournament with a record of 2–2.

Shortly before the start of training camp, Roberto Luongo announced that he would be relinquishing his captaincy. Luongo served as the team captain for two seasons. Forward Henrik Sedin, was named team captain.

Schedule
The Canucks' pre-season schedule began on September 21 against the Calgary Flames. It will be a split series where each franchise will split into two squads to play two simultaneous games, one at the Saddledome in Calgary and one at Rogers Arena in Vancouver. In addition, the Canucks will play each of the Edmonton Oilers, Anaheim Ducks and San Jose Sharks twice, once at home and once on the road. The Canucks finished the preseason with a record of 3–5.

Regular season

Schedule
The Canucks officially kicked off their 2010–11 campaign on October 9 at Rogers Arena against the Los Angeles Kings. With the Canucks celebrating their 40th anniversary, the NHL scheduled this game to honour the Canucks' first-ever NHL game against the Los Angeles Kings on October 9, 1970. The Canucks lost the game in a shootout by a score of 2–1. They began the season slowly, going 2–3–1 in their first six games before going on a six-game winning streak. The loss to break the streak came as part of a five-game road trip where they recorded a 2–2–1 record before returning home for their most lopsided loss of the year, a 7–1 defeat at the hands of the Chicago Blackhawks. Following the loss the Canucks went 18–4–3, which included an eight-game winning streak, and two four-game winning streaks, before losing three consecutive games in extra time. They proceeded to win the next six games, but ended February alternating wins and losses. Vancouver's win against the Minnesota Wild on March 14, 2011, put the team at 101 points in the standings. It was the fastest the Canucks reached the 100-point mark in franchise history. Next, the team recorded its 50th victory of the season for the first time in franchise history on March 27. They would get top seed in the Western Conference on 2 days later. And it would get its first Presidents' Trophy two days later.
The season finale took place on April 9, 2011, against the Calgary Flames, which saw the Canucks win 3–2 in overtime. Daniel Sedin registered two assists in order to clinch the Art Ross Trophy, a year after his brother did it.

Excluding four shootout-winning goals, the Canucks scored 258 goals, the most in the League. Furthermore, excluding their five shootout goals allowed, the Canucks gave up only 180 goals in their 82 games, the fewest in the League. They also scored the most power-play goals, with 72, and had the best power-play percentage, at 24.32% (72 for 296).

The Canucks were also the first team since the  champion Montreal Canadiens to finish the league with the most goals scored and fewest goals against. They also finished the regular season with the top ranked power play and third ranked penalty kill. They almost finished the same identical record as the 1988–89 Flames (except they had two fewer losses).

Special events

The Canucks kicked off their season with a pre-game ceremony on October 9, 2010, to commemorate their 40th Anniversary. They also announced Henrik Sedin as the 13th captain of the team.

Prior to their game on December 11, 2010, against the Tampa Bay Lightning, the Canucks honoured Markus Näslund by retiring his number 19 jersey. Näslund was the third player in franchise history to receive the honour following Stan Smyl and Trevor Linden. Näslund spent 12 seasons with the Canucks, nine as captain. He also holds the franchise lead in points scored with 756. The retirement ceremony coincided with Mattias Öhlund's return to Vancouver for the first time since signing with the Lightning in 2009.

The Canucks also announced that they will be introducing a "Ring of Honour" to commemorate past players. Four players will have their names added to the ring this season. The first player to get the honour will be Orland Kurtenbach who was the first ever captain of the Vancouver Canucks. Kurtenbach's ceremony took place on October 26. Kirk McLean was added to the ring of honour on November 24. McLean helped lead the Canucks to game seven of the 1994 Stanley Cup Finals. The third player to be inducted into the Ring of Honour will be Thomas Gradin on January 24. Gradin was part of the 1982 Canucks team that made it to the Stanley Cup Final. He now works as a European scout for organization and is heavily praised at having convinced then-general manager Dave Nonis to draft Alexander Edler.

The final ceremony took place on March 14 when Harold Snepsts was inducted into the Ring of Honour.

Playoffs

The Vancouver Canucks were the first team in the NHL to clinch a berth in the playoffs. Two weeks later, they clinched their division on March 16.
The win earned them their fourth Northwest Division title in five years, thus guaranteeing them home ice advantage in the first round of the Stanley Cup playoffs. This was the fastest the team had clinched a playoff spot in franchise history. The team earned the top seed in the Western Conference on March 29 and the Presidents' Trophy two days later, guaranteeing home ice advantage throughout the playoffs.

The Canucks opened their post-season schedule with a series against the defending Stanley Cup champion Chicago Blackhawks. This was the third time the two teams played in the playoffs in consecutive years with the Blackhawks winning the first two, both in six games. Vancouver won the opening three games of the series before Chicago responded to force a game seven. Alexandre Burrows scored the winning goal in overtime to clinch the series victory.

Vancouver moved on to play the Nashville Predators in the second round of the playoffs. It is the first time the two teams have met in the playoffs. Vancouver won the first game before Nashville evened up the series at one. Vancouver won both games in Nashville, Game 3 3–2 in overtime on a Ryan Kesler deflection goal, and 4–2 in Game 4. The series returned to Vancouver for Game 5, where the Predators staved off elimination, beating the Canucks 4–3. Forward Joel Ward scored two goals, including the game winner. The Canucks won the series 4–2 after a 2–1 victory in Game 6.

The Canucks played the San Jose Sharks for the first time ever in the Western Conference Final after San Jose eliminated the Detroit Red Wings in Game 7. Vancouver prevailed in five games with a double overtime goal scored by Kevin Bieksa to send the Canucks to the Stanley Cup Finals for the third time in franchise history and the first time since 1994.
They would face the Boston Bruins after Boston defeated the Tampa Bay Lightning in seven games. The series began on June 1 with a 1–0 victory. Roberto Luongo picked up his third shutout of the playoffs while Raffi Torres scored the dramatic lone goal with 18.5 seconds remaining in the third period. However, after Game 1, the series became heated and physical, after Alexandre Burrows apparently bit Patrice Bergeron during game one (after the incident was reviewed by the league Burrows was not suspended) and in Game 3, a hit by Aaron Rome left Bruins winger Nathan Horton concussed and unable to play for the rest of the series. Despite playing without Horton – one of the Bruins best goal scorers – for the final four games of the series, Boston was able to pick up their play and comeback to win the series despite staking Vancouver leads of 2–0 and 3–2. It was Boston's first Stanley Cup victory in 39 years.

Broadcast changes

Television
On July 28, 2010, the Vancouver Canucks announced a new partnership with Rogers Sportsnet One, a new national sports channel with regional broadcast capabilities. The new partnership included 13 additional games, on top of the 45 on Rogers Sportsnet Pacific, to be shown thus eliminating Canucks TV Pay-Per-View. In addition, CBC Hockey Night in Canada announced that it would once again be showing 14 games nationally while TSN would show 10 games.

Radio
Also on July 28, 2010, Tom Larscheid announced that he would be retiring at the start of the season. His final radio call was during the Vancouver Canucks season opener against the Los Angeles Kings on October 9. He spent 33 years as the colour commentator for the Vancouver Canucks and was replaced by Dave Tomlinson.

Schedule and results

Pre-season

Regular season

Playoffs

The Vancouver Canucks clinched their first Presidents' Trophy in franchise history, thus guaranteeing themselves home ice advantage for the duration of the playoffs.

Standings

Divisional standings

Conference standings

Player statistics

Skaters

Note: GP = Games played; G = Goals; A = Assists; Pts = Points; +/− = Plus/minus; PIM = Penalty minutes

Goaltenders
Note: GP = Games played; TOI = Time on ice (minutes); W = Wins; L = Losses; OT = Overtime losses; GA = Goals against; GAA= Goals against average; SA= Shots against; Sv% = Save percentage; SO= Shutouts

†Denotes player spent time with another team before joining Canucks. Stats reflect time with Canucks only.
‡Traded mid-season. Stats reflect time with Canucks only.

Awards and records

Records

Milestones

Awards

Draft picks
Vancouver's picks at the 2010 NHL Entry Draft in Los Angeles.

 This draft pick originally belonged to the Phoenix Coyotes. It was acquired from Phoenix in exchange for Mathieu Schneider.

Transactions

Trades

Notes

Players retained

Free agents acquiredFree agents lost

Farm teams
 The Manitoba Moose will remain the Canucks' American Hockey League affiliate for the 2010–11 season.
 The Victoria Salmon Kings will remain the Canucks' ECHL affiliate for the 2010–11 season.

See also
 2010–11 NHL season

References

External links
 2010–11 Vancouver Canucks season Official Site

Vancouver Canucks season, 2010-11
Vancouver Canucks seasons
Presidents' Trophy seasons
Western Conference (NHL) championship seasons
Vancouver C
V